Districts in the London Borough of Croydon include:

Addington
Addiscombe
Ashburton
Beddington (also partly in the London Borough of Sutton)
Broad Green
Coombe 
Coulsdon
Croydon - the principal area
Crystal Palace - shared with Lambeth, Southwark, Lewisham and Bromley
Forestdale
Hamsey Green (also partly in the Tandridge District)
Kenley
Monks Orchard
New Addington
Norbury (also partly in the London Borough of Lambeth and the London Borough of Merton)
Norwood New Town
Old Coulsdon
Pollards Hill (also partly in the London Borough of Merton)
Purley
Purley Oaks
Roundshaw (also partly in the London Borough of Sutton)
Sanderstead
Selhurst
Selsdon
Shirley
South Croydon
South Norwood
Thornton Heath
Upper Norwood
Upper Shirley
Waddon
Woodcote
Woodside
Whyteleafe (also partly in the Tandridge District)

Lists of places in London